The East Timorese records in swimming are the fastest ever performances of swimmers from the East Timor, which are recognised and ratified by the National Swimming Federation of Timor Leste.

All records were set in finals unless noted otherwise.

Long Course (50 m)

Men

Women

Short Course (25 m)

Men

Women

References

East Timor
Records
Swimming
Swimming